Acantholimon goeksunicum is a species of plant belonging to the family Plumbaginaceae. It is only found on calcareous steppes in southeastern Anatolia (Turkey).

This is a very small, low shrublet with scapes of up to 8 cm bearing two-branched spikes of pink flowers in July.

References

goksunicum
Plants described in 2003
Flora of Turkey